Members serving in the European Parliament session from 2019 to 2024, following the 2019 election. For a full single list, see: List of members of the European Parliament 2019–2024.

MEPs
 List of members of the European Parliament for Austria, 2019–2024
 List of members of the European Parliament for Belgium, 2019–2024
 List of members of the European Parliament for Bulgaria, 2019–2024
 List of members of the European Parliament for Croatia, 2019–2024
 List of members of the European Parliament for Cyprus, 2019–2024
 List of members of the European Parliament for the Czech Republic, 2019–2024
 List of members of the European Parliament for Denmark, 2019–2024
 List of members of the European Parliament for Estonia, 2019–2024
 List of members of the European Parliament for Finland, 2019–2024
 List of members of the European Parliament for France, 2019–2024
 List of members of the European Parliament for Germany, 2019–2024
 List of members of the European Parliament for Greece, 2019–2024
 List of members of the European Parliament for Hungary, 2019–2024
 List of members of the European Parliament for Ireland, 2019–2024
 List of members of the European Parliament for Italy, 2019–2024
 List of members of the European Parliament for Latvia, 2019–2024
 List of members of the European Parliament for Lithuania, 2019–2024
 List of members of the European Parliament for Luxembourg, 2019–2024
 List of members of the European Parliament for Malta, 2019–2024
 List of members of the European Parliament for the Netherlands, 2019–2024
 List of members of the European Parliament for Poland, 2019–2024
 List of members of the European Parliament for Portugal, 2019–2024
 List of members of the European Parliament for Romania, 2019–2024
 List of members of the European Parliament for Slovakia, 2019–2024
 List of members of the European Parliament for Slovenia, 2019–2024
 List of members of the European Parliament for Spain, 2019–2024
 List of members of the European Parliament for Sweden, 2019–2024
 List of members of the European Parliament for the United Kingdom, 2019–2020